The San Juan Spruce is a Sitka spruce (Picea sitchensis) tree located in the San Juan Valley of Vancouver Island, British Columbia, Canada. Until July 2016 it was the second largest known Sitka spruce tree by volume, surpassed only by the Queets Spruce in Washington, United States.

History

The tree flourished due to its location on the shaded southern slopes of the San Juan Valley and on the banks of the San Juan River.

In July 2016, the San Juan Spruce lost significant height and mass due to a lightning strike. It is no longer considered among the largest Sitka spruce trees but its large diameter is still remarkable.

Dimensions
These measurements were taken sometime before 2010, at least six years prior to the tree's partial collapse.

See also 
 Port Renfrew - a nearby community
 Red Creek Fir
 List of individual trees

References

External links

 Looking up into the canopy of the San Juan Spruce, October 2010
 Partial collapse of the San Juan Spruce, July 2016

Individual trees in British Columbia
Juan de Fuca region